Chenillé-Champteussé is a commune in the Maine-et-Loire department of western France. The municipality was established on 1 January 2016 and consists of the former communes of Chenillé-Changé and Champteussé-sur-Baconne.

See also 
Communes of the Maine-et-Loire department

References 

Communes of Maine-et-Loire
States and territories established in 2016